Ypsolopha kristalleniae is a moth of the family Ypsolophidae. It is known from Crete and Turkey.

The wingspan is about 19 mm.

References

External links
lepiforum.de

Ypsolophidae
Moths of Europe
Moths of Asia